Hasselbeck is a surname of German origin. People with this surname include:
Elisabeth Hasselbeck, co-host of United States talk show The View.
Matt Hasselbeck, American football player
Tim Hasselbeck, American football player
Don Hasselbeck, American football player
Hasselback Potatoes, a Swedish dish.